Paju National Football Center, shortly called Paju NFC is training ground in Paju, South Korea. It is mostly used as training ground by Korea Republic national football team and other national football team in South Korea.

Structure and facilities 
Grass ground
 Blue Dragon
 White Tiger 
 Hwarang
 Chungmu
 Sprout
 Blue Clouds
Artificial grass ground
 Unification
Futsal ground

External links 
 Paju NFC at KFA website 
 Paju NFC at KFA website 

Paju
Football venues in South Korea
Sports venues in Gyeonggi Province
Buildings and structures in Paju
National football academies